Diospyros chaetocarpa, is a tree in the ebony family, native to south western parts of Sri Lanka, where it is known as "Kalu Madiriya" in the Sinhala language. The Sinhala name "Kalu Madiriya" is also known to be used for Diospyros oppositifolia.

References

External resources
http://plants.jstor.org/specimen/k000792377

chaetocarpa
Flora of Sri Lanka